Charles Thomas Le Quesne (3 November 1885 – 22 November 1954), was a Jersey born, British Liberal Party politician and barrister.

Background
He was born in Saint Helier, Jersey, the son of Charles John Le Quesne. He was educated at Victoria College, Jersey and Exeter College, Oxford where he received a 1st class Honors in Mods in 1906 and a 1st class in Lit. Hum. in 1908. He married Eileen Gould. They had four sons and one daughter.

Legal career
He was called to the bar, at Inner Temple, in 1912. He took silk, becoming a King's Counsel in 1925. In 1950, he returned to Jersey and was appointed Lieutenant Bailiff. Up to this point, the Royal Court's judgments were in the French style of jugements motivés, written in French by the Greffier rather than the judge, and expressing the reasons for the court's decision only very briefly. Le Quesne changed the language of judgments to English and adopted the common law style of judgments, where the judge gives detailed reasons for accepting or rejecting the rival submissions made at trial by counsel.

Political career
In 1908 he was President of the Oxford Union.
He was a last minute Liberal candidate for the Hemel Hempstead Division of Hertfordshire at the 1929 General Election;

Following the formation of the National Government in 1931, an election was called. Le Quesne stood again as a Liberal in support of the government but his main opponent, the Conservative was also a supporter;

In June 1936 he was elected to serve on the Liberal Party Council. From 1946-47 he was President of the Baptist Union of Great Britain and Ireland. He was made a Commander of the Dutch Order of Orange-Nassau.

References

External links 
Portrait of Le Quesne at the National Portrait Gallery: http://www.npg.org.uk/collections/search/portraitLarge/mw102801/Charles-Thomas-Le-Quesne

1885 births
1954 deaths
20th-century Baptists
Alumni of Exeter College, Oxford
British Baptists
Commanders of the Order of Orange-Nassau
Presidents of the Oxford Union